New Zealand cricket team toured Bangladesh from 14 October to 7 November 2004. They played two Test matches and three One Day Internationals against Bangladesh.

Tour match

Bangladesh Cricket Board XI vs New Zealanders

Test series

1st Test

2nd Test

ODI series

1st ODI

2nd ODI

3rd ODI

References

External links 
 New Zealand tour of Bangladesh 2004/05

International cricket competitions in 2004–05
2004-05
Bangladeshi cricket seasons from 2000–01
2004 in New Zealand cricket
2004 in Bangladeshi cricket